Landslide: The Final Days of the Trump Presidency is a nonfiction book by Michael Wolff. It was published by Henry Holt and Company in 2021. This book is the third in a nonfiction trilogy by Wolff updating information on the presidency of Donald Trump and focuses on the final days and the ending of Trump's presidency.

The two preceding books of the trilogy are Fire and Fury: Inside the Trump White House and Siege: Trump Under Fire.

Reception
Dwight Garner, reviewing for The New York Times, praised the book as "smart, vivid and intrepid"; he viewed it as "more vivid and apt" than I Alone Can Fix It  by Washington Post journalists Carol Leonnig and Philip Rucker, a book covering the same time period and released about the same time. Garner wrote that the "impudent and inquisitive qualities" of Landslide were similar to Joe McGinniss' The Selling of the President 1968 and that Wolff effectively "zeros in on the chaos and the kakistocracy, on how nearly everyone with a sense of decency fled Trump in his final months, and how he was left with clapped-out charlatans like Sidney Powell and Giuliani."

See also
 The New York Times Nonfiction Best Sellers of 2021

References

External links

2021 non-fiction books
American non-fiction books
Books about American politicians
Books about the Trump administration
Books by Michael Wolff
English-language books
Henry Holt and Company books
Books about Donald Trump
Criticism of Donald Trump
Biographies about politicians